(also Ryō Un Maru) was a Japanese fishing boat that was washed away from its mooring in Aomori Prefecture by the March 2011 Tōhoku earthquake and tsunami and drifted across the Pacific Ocean. The unmanned hulk entered U.S. waters on 1 April 2012, and, after salvage attempts failed, was  sunk by the U.S. Coast Guard on 5 April 2012 to prevent the hulk from becoming a hazard to navigation.

History

The Ryou-Un Maru, a fishing vessel in the Japanese merchant fleet, was originally built around 1982. It was owned by a Hokkaido-based fishing company and was used for shrimping or squidding. After a long service career the ship's owner decided it was too old for continued use and moored it in Aomori Prefecture in Honshu pending sale. When the Tōhoku earthquake and tsunami struck in March 2011, Ryou-Un Maru broke free and was set adrift.

Like most countries, Japanese law requires a ship be disposed of or dismantled properly before allowing its registration to be canceled.  However, all parties assumed the vessel sank in the disaster, so the Japan Coast Guard granted the owner an exception.

For over a year the Ryou-Un Maru drifted across the Pacific as a ghost ship and was carried eastward by the Kuroshio Current. On 20 March 2012, it was spotted in Canadian waters by Royal Canadian Air Force CP-140 Aurora aircraft. As its registration had been canceled, the ship no longer had a legal owner responsible for it. The next day, the crew of the U.S. Coast Guard Cutter  assessed the ship's condition.

On 5 April 2012, the Canadian fishing vessel Bernice C attempted to salvage the stricken vessel, but a ruptured fuel tank proved impossible to pump out and a tow failed. The U.S. Coast Guard then determined that sinking the abandoned vessel was necessary to prevent it running aground or becoming a hazard to navigation.

References

External links

U.S. Coast Guard photos of shelling
U.S. Coast Guard video of the ship being fired upon
MFV Ryou-Un Maru (+2012) Wrecksite.eu

2011 Tōhoku earthquake and tsunami
Fishing vessels of Japan
Shipwrecks in the Pacific Ocean
Maritime incidents in 2012
1982 ships
Maritime incidents in 2011
Ghost ships